Gracilentulus is a genus of proturans in the family Acerentomidae.

Species
 Gracilentulus americanus Szeptycki, 1993
 Gracilentulus aokii Imadaté, 1982
 Gracilentulus atlantidis Szeptycki, 1993
 Gracilentulus catulus Szeptycki, 1993
 Gracilentulus chichibuensis Nakamura, 1995
 Gracilentulus corsicanus Szeptycki, 1993
 Gracilentulus europeus Szeptycki, 1993
 Gracilentulus fjellbergi Szeptycki, 1993
 Gracilentulus flabelli Yin, 1985
 Gracilentulus floridanus Ewing, 1924
 Gracilentulus gracilis (Berlese, 1908)
 Gracilentulus hyleus Szeptycki, 1993
 Gracilentulus maijiawensis Yin & Imadaté, 1979
 Gracilentulus meridianus (Condé, 1945)
 Gracilentulus orousseti Szeptycki, 1993
 Gracilentulus sachikoae Imadaté, 1965
 Gracilentulus sardinianus Nosek, 1979
 Gracilentulus shipingensis Yin, 1984

References

Protura